The lowland sooty boubou (Laniarius leucorhynchus), also known as the sooty boubou, is a species of bird in the family Malaconotidae.  It is found in Angola, Benin, Cameroon, Central African Republic, Republic of the Congo, Democratic Republic of the Congo, Ivory Coast, Equatorial Guinea, Gabon, Ghana, Guinea, Guinea-Bissau, Liberia, Nigeria, Sierra Leone, South Sudan, Togo, and Uganda.  Its natural habitats are subtropical or tropical moist lowland forest and subtropical or tropical moist shrubland.

References

lowland sooty boubou
Birds of Central Africa
Birds of West Africa
lowland sooty boubou
Taxonomy articles created by Polbot